Metten is a municipality in the district of Deggendorf in Bavaria in Germany. The town grew up around the Benedictine Metten Abbey, founded in 766. Metten is also the birthplace of former Bayern Munich goalkeeper Sepp Maier.

References

Deggendorf (district)